Roman Janoušek (born 30 August 1972) is a Czech former football player. He played in the top flight of the Czech Republic, making more than 200 top-flight appearances spanning the existence of the Czechoslovak First League and the Gambrinus liga.

Honours

Club

 Viktoria Žižkov
 Czech Cup: 2000–01

References

External links
 

1972 births
Living people
Czech footballers
Czech First League players
FC Hradec Králové players
SK Slavia Prague players
FC Slovan Liberec players
FC Viktoria Plzeň players
SFC Opava players
FK Drnovice players
FK Viktoria Žižkov players
Association football midfielders